Elena Ruiz Barril (born 29 October 2004) is a Spanish water polo player who won the silver medal with the Spain women's national water polo team at the 2020 Summer Olympics celebrated in Tokyo, Japan.

See also
 Spain women's Olympic water polo team records and statistics
 List of Olympic medalists in water polo (women)

References

External links
 
 

Spanish female water polo players
Living people
2004 births
Water polo players from Catalonia
Water polo players at the 2020 Summer Olympics
Medalists at the 2020 Summer Olympics
Olympic silver medalists for Spain in water polo
21st-century Spanish women
People from Vallès Occidental
Sportspeople from the Province of Barcelona
Sportswomen from Catalonia